Download to own is a concept of legally downloading movies to your computer via a network such as the internet. Generally to obtain movies this way a user must have a broadband connection and an account from an internet distribution company.

Download-to-own movies are more convenient to watch, as opposed to having to find and insert a DVD into your computer because once it is saved on the hard drive it can be viewed instantly.  Movies are saved on the hard drive, typically in AVI format, and are compressed using MPEG-4 or DivX compression formats.
Disadvantages to download-to-own movies are that they have generally large file sizes, usually from 600MB to over 1GB. They may take a long time to download, and will fill up a hard drive quickly. The movie may be accidentally deleted or lost through a hard drive crash, but with proper back up procedures, and the continuing drop in prices for larger hard drives becoming commonplace, these problems can be minimized.

Another disadvantage is that due to compression and other factors they rarely have the same image-quality as a regular DVD, much less than that of a high-definition format, and also often lack multi-channel audio. They may also be distributed in a DRM-protected format (such as through iTunes), which makes it difficult to play them on other portable devices, or to burn to a DVD to play on a television. 

File sharing
Home video